Peceneaga can refer to the following places in Romania:

 Peceneaga, a commune in Tulcea County
 Peceneaga, a tributary of the Bistra Mărului in Caraș-Severin County
 Peceneaga (Danube), also called Aiorman, a tributary of the Danube in Tulcea County
 Peceneaga, also called Pecineaga, a tributary of the Slănic in Buzău County

See also
 Pecineaga